Chrysalis is a 10-volume science fiction anthology series, edited by Roy Torgeson. Vol. 1-7 (1977-1980) were published in paperback by Zebra Books and vol. 8-10 (1980-1983) were published in hardcover by Doubleday. According to The Enyclopedia of Science Fiction, Torgenson chose the anthology's title "to suggest something developing and changing and about to give birth to beauty".

Content 

Chrysalis regularly included original stories by noted writers such as Theodore Sturgeon, Orson Scott Card, R. A. Lafferty, Philip José Farmer, Barry N. Malzberg, Ward Moore, Michael Bishop, Tanith Lee, Roger Zelazny, Thomas F. Monteleone, Gardner Dozois, and Pat Murphy. While the bulk of the stories published in the anthology series were science fiction, it also included fantasy and horror.

Volumes 

Chrysalis (1977, Zebra Books)
Chrysalis 2 (1978, Zebra Books)
Chrysalis 3 (1978, Zebra Books)
Chrysalis 4 (1979, Zebra Books)
Chrysalis 5 (1979, Zebra Books)
Chrysalis 6 (1980, Zebra Books)
Chrysalis 7 (1980, Zebra Books)
Chrysalis 8 (1980, Doubleday)
Chrysalis 9 (1981, Doubleday)
Chrysalis 10 (1983, Doubleday)

References

External links 
Chrysalis entry at the Internet Speculative Fiction Database
Chrysalis entry on The Enyclopedia of Science Fiction

Science fiction anthology series
Zebra Books books
Doubleday (publisher) books